Roen Davis (born 21 April 2004) is a Bahamian footballer.

Career statistics

International

References

External links
 

2004 births
Living people
Association football midfielders
Bahamian footballers
Bahamas international footballers